The 2003 Las Vegas mayoral election took place on April 8, 2003 to elect the mayor of Las Vegas, Nevada. The election was held concurrently with various other local elections, and was officially nonpartisan.

Incumbent Mayor Oscar Goodman was reelected. With Goodman winning a majority in the initial round of the election, no runoff was needed.

Results

References

2003
2003 Nevada elections
2003 United States mayoral elections